Gürün is a town and a district of Sivas Province of Turkey. The mayor is Nami Çiftçi (MHP).

History

Toponymy 
The current name Gürün is most probably a corruption of the ancient name Tegarama, a city in Anatolia during the Bronze Age. In Armenian, the town is known as Gurin or Gyurin. In Kurdish the locality is known as Girîn.

Ancient history 
The city was inhabited during the Old Assyrian Kingdom and Hittite Empire. Ancient rock caves dating to 2000 BC are located in the district. The caves would have been in use, possibly as a kind of apartment complex, during the Hittite period. The caves were also "used as a cold storage area, woodshed and animal feed storage area by local people until a short time ago", and are now open to visitors. Nami Çiftçi, the town's mayor, told Daily Sabah that they "don't have a precise date determined by expert engineers or by people who are well-versed in this field, so I invite our historians to Gürün. Come, bring your knowledge and your tools, study these caves so that we can have the data regarding their age, and we can announce it to the world".

Modern history 
During the Armenian Genocide, a sizable portion of the city's Armenian population was deported and killed. According to the memoir Goodbye, Antoura, during the pre-genocide years the Armenian population had achieved a level of stability in Gürün, with at least one Armenian family owning large swathes of land and orchards. In 1915, the Ottoman government appropriated these lands, and the Armenian population was deported southward and westward into the Syrian desert, eventually reaching the cities of Homs and Hama. 

A student association of Armenians from Gürün was founded in Boston in 1899, which later became the Compatriotic Union of Gurin. The union's initial purpose was to assist survivors of the genocide and their families, and it established chapters across the world. The compatriotic union published two periodicals, one from 1930 to 1933 in New York and another from 1976 to 1981 in New Jersey, as well as a book titled Badmakirk' Gurini ("History Book of Gurin", 1974, Beirut). The union cooperated with Armenians from Gürün in Yerevan to found the village of Nor Kyurin in Soviet Armenia. The organization was dissolved in the late 20th century, as the last Armenians born in Gürün died of old age.

In September 2018, it was announced that a dilapidated Armenian church in Gürün would be renovated.

Demographics
In his seyahatname, Evliya Çelebi claimed that the town's population then was wholly made up of Turkomans. In 1914, there were 13,874 Armenians living in the kaza of Gürün, which contained five villages that were exclusively Armenian and a few scattered settlements. Gürün, the kaza's seat, had 12,168 residents, 8,406 of whom were Armenian.

Notable people 
 Antranig Dzarugian (1913–1989), Armenian writer, poet, educator and journalist
 Haroutiun Galentz (1910–1967), Armenian painter
 Abdüllatif Şener (born 1954), Turkish politician
 Mustafa Karasu (born 1950), a deputy chairman of the Kurdistan Workers' Party (PKK)
 Vahe Vahian (1909–1998), Armenian poet, writer, editor, pedagogue and orator
 İsmet Yılmaz (born 1961), Turkish politician
 Cem Yılmaz  (born 1973), Turkish comedian

References

External links

 World Surface - Gürün, Turkey
 Luc Vartan Baronian - The Former Armenian Community of Gurin

Further reading
 Panian, Karnig. Goodbye, Antoura: A Memoir of the Armenian Genocide. Translated by Simon Beugekian. Stanford: Stanford University Press, 2015. 

Districts of Sivas Province
Populated places in Sivas Province